Andrew Dolan (20 August 1920 – 1 January 1971) was a Scottish professional footballer who played as an inside forward in the Football League.

References

Sources

1920 births
1971 deaths
Footballers from Glasgow
Scottish footballers
Alloa Athletic F.C. players
Accrington Stanley F.C. (1891) players
Albion Rovers F.C. players
Bury F.C. players
Raith Rovers F.C. players
English Football League players
Scottish Football League players
Association football inside forwards